Rafidain Bank ( lit. Bank of Mesopotamia) is the largest bank in Iraq, with 165 branches inside Iraq and with branches in Cairo, Beirut, Abu Dhabi, Bahrain, Sana'a, Amman and Jabal Amman. Its HQ is in central Baghdad. The bank was established in 1941 and in the 1960s in a wave of Ba'ath nationalisation became a state bank. In 1988, the Rafidain's non-performing assets were carved out into the Rasheed Bank.

Before the First Gulf War, Rafidain Bank "was the Arab world’s largest commercial bank with total assets of USD 47 billion.".

The Bank was very badly damaged by the first Gulf War and the economic sanctions against Iraq. These sanctions were behind the closure of Rafidain's London Branch in 1990. During the second Gulf War, the bank was again badly hit. It is estimated that around a third of Rafidain's branches were destroyed during the second Gulf War and that the bank lost around $300m USD through looting. Today, Rafidain Bank has around 45% of banking assets in Iraq.

In 2007, Bayan Jabor, the Iraqi Minister of Finance, signed a contract with British companies B-Plan Information Systems and Misys to rebuild the bank, in a turnkey contract to supply a core banking system, hardware, communications systems, and training to Rafidain Staff, across all branches inside and outside Iraq. This project will cover basic retail banking and trade finance but advanced banking functions such as ATM networks, Card Management and internet banking will be considered by the Ministry of Finance in later stages.

This project will represent the first commercial bank in Iraq to work on a modern electronic banking system and should be completed by the end of 2009.

See also

Iraqi dinar

References 
 http://www.cbi.iq/index.php?pid=IraqFinancialInst&lang=en

External links
 Official website 
 Official website of Rafidain Project Implementer 
 Official website of Rafidain Project Software supplier 

Companies based in Baghdad
Banks of Iraq
Banks established in 1941
1941 establishments in Iraq
Iraqi brands